The 2011–12 North Superleague was the eleventh staging of the North Superleague, the highest tier of league competition in the North Region of the Scottish Junior Football Association. The season began on 6 August 2011. The winners of this competition gain direct entry to round one of the 2012–13 Scottish Cup.

Hermes secured the title on 2 May 2012, becoming North Superleague champions for the first time.

The North Region management committee decreed in May 2012 that two of the clubs eligible for promotion, Inverness City and Deveronside, did not fulfil ground requirements for Superleague membership, and there would therefore only be one relegation place this season as opposed to the normal two. This decision was overturned on appeal by the SJFA and Deveronside will be allowed to contest a play-off with Forres Thistle to decide the final promotion/relegation spot, subject to ground improvements being carried out before the date of the tie.

Member clubs for the 2011–12 season
Culter are the reigning champions. North Division One winners Inverness City were ineligible for promotion to the Superleague on ground criteria. Division One runners-up Forres Thistle replace the relegated Fraserburgh United. A play-off was arranged between 13th placed Longside and Glentanar who finished 3rd in Division One to decide the final promotion/relegation spot. This was won by Longside who retain their place in the Superleague.

Managerial changes

Table

Results

Superleague play-off

References

External links
 North Region JFA

6
SJFA North Region Superleague seasons